Hilfikon was a municipality in the district of Bremgarten in the canton of Aargau in Switzerland.  In January 2010 Hilfikon merged into Villmergen.

History
Hilfikon is first mentioned in 924 as Hilfiniswilare.  In 1250 it was mentioned as Hilfinchon.  In 1290 Markwart and Arnold von Hilfikon built a tower house in Hilfikon.  The area ruled by the Hilfikon family is first documented in 1415.  Though, by 1472 it was owned by the Meiss family of Zurich, then in 1498 it became a fief of Hans von Seengen, and in 1506–10 it was owned by Melchior von Gilgen of Lucerne.  He also purchased the Bailiwick of Sarmenstorf in 1514, and in 1510 donated a chapel.  In 1628 the property was purchased by John Lussi Landamman for Unterwalden, then in 1644 it went to the Zwyer family of Evibach in Silenen.  In 1743 the village transferred by marriage to the Tschudi family of Glarus, which were deposed in 1749 by Augustin Victor Franz Roll from Solothurn.  He had the late gothic chapel demolished and a new chapel built.  The new chapel's choir is a replica of the Church of the Holy Sepulchre.  Religiously, Hilfikon has always belonged to the Villmergen parish.  So, in 1743 a part of the village came under the power of Villmergen's courts, while the other part remained under the nobles' courts.  In 1798 Augustine von Roll eliminated this division of judicial authority.

During the second Toggenburg War, in 1712, the castle was the seat of the Catholic General Staff.  In 1832 the castle was sold along with other properties and has since had several owners.

Into the 20th century the small town was dominated by agriculture and a few small businesses.  In 1916, the Wohlen-Meisterschwanden Railway was built, to which Hilfikon was a station. The village has a comprehensive school for primary education.

In 2010 Hilfikon merged into Villmergen.

Geography
 
Of this area, 63.6% is used for agricultural purposes, while 25.4% is forested. Of the rest of the land, 10.4% is settled (buildings or roads) and the remainder (0.6%) is non-productive (rivers or lakes).

The village is located in the Bremgarten district along the old Villmergen-Sarmenstorf road on the northern edge of the Lindenberg.

Coat of arms
The blazon of the municipal coat of arms is Argent an Elephant Sable defendu and harnessed Or carrying a Tower embattled Gules doored and windowed of the second.

Demographics
, 9.9% of the population was made up of foreign nationals. Over the last 10 years the population has decreased at a rate of −2.4%. Most of the population speaks German (95.1%), with French being second most common ( 3.1%) and Italian being third ( 0.9%).

The age distribution, in Hilfikon is; 24 children or 9.6% of the population are between 0 and 9 years old and 32 teenagers or 12.7% are between 10 and 19.  Of the adult population, 29 people or 11.6% of the population are between 20 and 29 years old.  29 people or 11.6% are between 30 and 39, 56 people or 22.3% are between 40 and 49, and 42 people or 16.7% are between 50 and 59.  The senior population distribution is 9 people or 3.6% of the population are between 60 and 69 years old, 15 people or 6.0% are between 70 and 79, there are 12 people or 4.8% who are between 80 and 89,and there are 3 people or 1.2% who are 90 and older.

 the average number of residents per living room was 0.57 which is about equal to the cantonal average of 0.57 per room.  In this case, a room is defined as space of a housing unit of at least  as normal bedrooms, dining rooms, living rooms, kitchens and habitable cellars and attics.  About 73.1% of the total households were owner occupied, or in other words did not pay rent (though they may have a mortgage or a rent-to-own agreement).  , there were 3 homes with 1 or 2 persons in the household, 29 homes with 3 or 4 persons in the household, and 46 homes with 5 or more persons in the household.  The average number of people per household was 2.73 individuals.   there were 63 single family homes (or 62.4% of the total) out of a total of 101 homes and apartments.  There were a total of 1 empty apartments for a 1.0% vacancy rate.  , the construction rate of new housing units was 4.1 new units per 1000 residents.

In the 2007 federal election the most popular party was the SVP which received 41% of the vote.  The next three most popular parties were the CVP (19.7%), the FDP (14%) and the SP (13.1%).

The entire Swiss population is generally well educated.  In Hilfikon about 83.8% of the population (between age 25-64) have completed either non-mandatory upper secondary education or additional higher education (either University or a Fachhochschule).  Of the school age population, there are 13 students attending primary school in the municipality.

The historical population is given in the following table:

Heritage sites of national significance
Schloss Hilfikon and chapel are listed as a Swiss heritage site of national significance.

Economy
, Hilfikon had an unemployment rate of 1.89%.  , there were 20 people employed in the primary economic sector and about 7 businesses involved in this sector.  4 people are employed in the secondary sector and there are 3 businesses in this sector.  18 people are employed in the tertiary sector, with 9 businesses in this sector.

 there were 114 total workers who lived in the municipality.  Of these, 84 or about 73.7% of the residents worked outside Hilfikon while 19 people commuted into the municipality for work.  There were a total of 49 jobs (of at least 6 hours per week) in the municipality.  Of the working population, 8.5% used public transportation to get to work, and 51.7% used a private car.

Religion

References

External links
 

Cultural property of national significance in Aargau
Former municipalities of Aargau
Populated places disestablished in 2010